Gisela Fischer (21 April 1929 – 19 June 2014) was a German-born stage, film and television actress.

Biography
She was the granddaughter of the publisher Samuel Fischer. Her family fled from the Nazi German regime, and she grew up in a number of countries including Italy, Czechoslovakia and Japan before settling in Connecticut in New England. Ultimately she moved and based herself in Switzerland in the postwar era. Her best known role was that of Dockter Koska in the 1966 Alfred Hitchcock thriller film Torn Curtain.

Filmography

References

Bibliography
 Chapman, James. Hitchcock and the Spy Film. Bloomsbury Publishing, 2017.
 Petropoulos, Jonathan. Goering's Man in Paris. Yale University Press, 2021.
 Pollack, Howard. Marc Blitzstein: His Life, His Work, His World''. OUP USA 2012.

External links

1929 births
2014 deaths
People from Berlin
German film actresses
German stage actresses
German emigrants to Switzerland
People who emigrated to escape Nazism